John Njamah is a Nollywood actor, film producer, and film director. He is known for directing Fuji House of Commotion, Tinsel, Living In Lagos, Solitair, Casino, Emerald, Tide, and My Flatmates.

Early life and education 
John Njamah was born on April 17 as a twin at Njaaba in Orlu local government of Imo State. He obtained his first degree from Obafemi Awolowo University where he studied Dramatic Arts.

Personal life 
John Njamah is married to a Cameroonian  Agwi Tangi.

Filmography 
Fuji House of Commotion, 
Tinsel, Living In Lagos, 
Solitair, 
Casino, 
Emerald, 
Tide,
My Flatmates,
Breathless
Sparadise

References 

Living people
Nigerian film producers
Nigerian film directors
Obafemi Awolowo University alumni
Nigerian male film actors
21st-century Nigerian actors
21st-century Nigerian male actors
People from Imo State
Igbo actors
20th-century births